The Museo dell'Opera del Duomo (Museum of the Works of the Cathedral) in Florence, Italy is a museum containing many of the original works of art created for the Cattedrale di Santa Maria del Fiore, the cathedral (Duomo) of Florence.  As of August 2013, the director of the museum is Fr. Timothy Verdon, an American.

The museum is located just east of the Duomo, near its apse.  It opened in 1891, and now houses what has been called "one of the world's most important collections of sculpture."

Collection

Among the museum's holdings are Lorenzo Ghiberti's doors for the Baptistery of Florence Cathedral called the Gates of Paradise, the cantorias, or singing-galleries, designed for the cathedral by Luca della Robbia and Donatello, Donatello's Penitent Magdalene.

The collection also includes The Deposition, a pietà sculpted by Michelangelo which he intended for his own tomb.

Although it was reported on August 6, 2013, that a tourist had accidentally snapped a finger off of a 14th-century statue of the Virgin Mary by Giovanni d'Ambrogio, the finger was from a later repair and not part of the original work.

References

External links 

Museo dell'Opera del Duomo - Official Site

Art museums and galleries in Florence
Art museums established in 1891
Religious museums in Italy
1891 establishments in Italy